The Amazing

History

Self-titled debut (2009-2010) 
The Amazing released their self-titled debut on April 29, 2009 on Subliminal Sounds. The disc was reviewed by the Dagens Nyheter, and others including Sydsvenskan, and the Swedish morning broadsheet Svenska Dagbladet. In connection with the first disc, the group played on the program P3 Pop on Swedish Radio P3.

Gentle Stream (2011-present)
Gentle Stream was released in 2011. The Amazing did a Daytrotter session on December 5, 2012. They played, "Gone" from the album on Late Night with David Letterman on January 18, 2013. The Amazing appeared on World Cafe on February 6, 2013.

Their fourth album, Picture You, was released on February 17, 2015. Allmusic noted that it "is the culmination of all their work, with a combination of wonderfully rich arrangements, inspired playing and singing, and a batch of lengthy songs that both warm the heart and expand the mind".

Discography

Albums
 The Amazing (2009)
 Wait for a Light to Come EP (2010)
 Gentle Stream (2011)
 Picture You (2015)
 Ambulance (2016)
 In Transit (2018)

References

External links
 Official website
 The Amazing - Partisan Records

Swedish indie rock groups